Brad Dwyer (born 28 April 1993) is an English rugby league footballer who plays as a  for the Hull F.C. in the Super League.

He previously played for Leeds Rhinos, Warrington Wolves in the Super League, playing on loan from Warrington at the Swinton Lions and the London Broncos in the Kingstone Press Championship, and the Huddersfield Giants in the Super League. He has also spent time on loan from Leeds at Featherstone Rovers in the Betfred Championship.

Background
Dwyer was born in Wigan, Greater Manchester, England.

Career
He made his first team début for the Warrington side in March 2012 and scored his first Super League try in a local derby against Widnes a month later.

For the 2013 season he was one of six Wires players to sign for Championship club Swinton under the dual registration rules.

On 7 May 2014, he signed a new deal that would keep him at the Warrington outfit until November 2016.

He played in the 2016 Challenge Cup Final defeat by Hull F.C. at Wembley Stadium.

In July 2017, he signed a two-year deal to play for Leeds club from the start of the 2018 season.

The Featherstone Rovers most tries in a match record of six tries is jointly held by; Chris Bibb, Dwyer, and Michael Smith, Dwyer scored six tries against Rochdale on Sunday 1 July 2018.

On 17 October 2020, he played in the 2020 Challenge Cup Final victory for Leeds over Salford at Wembley Stadium.

References

External links
Leeds Rhinos profile
Profile at therhinos.co.uk
(archived by web.archive.org) Profile at warringtonwolves.com
SL profile

1993 births
Living people
English rugby league players
Featherstone Rovers players
Huddersfield Giants players
Hull F.C. players
Leeds Rhinos players
London Broncos players
Rugby league hookers
Rugby league players from Wigan
Swinton Lions players
Warrington Wolves players